Li hing mui, known as huamei in Mainland China, is salty dried Chinese plum (Prunus mume). It has a strong, distinctive flavor and is often said to be an acquired taste, as it has a combination of sweet, sour, and salty taste.   Originally from Guangdong Province, the name "li hing mui" means "traveling plum".  "Li hing" is "traveling" and "mui" is "plum" in Cantonese. Li hung mui is called hoshiume (dried plum) in Japan, where the salty and sour umeboshi is also popular.

Powder 

Li hing mui powder is made of ground plum skin that has previously been pickled in a combination of licorice, red food coloring, salt, sugar, and occasionally aspartame and or saccharine.  It can be used as a flavoring, usually sprinkled on candy and other fruits, notably pineapples, mangoes, guavas and apples. Li hing mui powder can be found in Hawaii, where local children like to put it on shave ice, sour candy, rock candy, popcorn, fruit, and arare.

Alcoholic beverages 
Recently, people have also been putting li hing powder into their alcoholic drinks—mainly tequila and cocktails. Many bars in Hawaii replace salt with this powder, since this powder is not only salty, but sweet and sour as well.  Other people also feel that it gives a tart and tangy twist.  Many bars in Hawaii also rim their glasses with li hing powder in addition to putting it in the drink.

Besides li hing powder, the whole li hing mui (red plum seed) is added directly to a bottle of tequila, filling the bottle at least half way with the plum seeds.  After a few weeks, the li hing plums will impart its reddish color and flavor to the tequila. And when you try to eat one of the plum seeds after you take them out,  you'll find that its flavor has gone entirely into the tequila.

Note that li hing powder is used on different plum varieties, and it comes in different colors.  The "red" powder is popular on fruits and assorted red plum varieties.  A "white" powder version is more commonly used on dried/dehydrated plums.

In China, huamei are often found in bottles of rice wine, like olives in a martini.

In Polynesia
Li hing mui was introduced to the Polynesian islands of Hawaii, Tahiti and Samoa in the late 19th century by Chinese labourers working in the plantations. It is typically eaten in powdered form, sprinkled over fruits such as mango or ambarella and other desserts.
 
Li hing mui achieved popularity in Hawaii by Yee Sheong, who in early 1900 began importing li hing mui and various other preserved fruits, from China to Hawaii. Yee thus started the li hing mui craze, which flourished with the company he founded, Yick Lung. Li hing mui can be found in Hawaiian and Asian markets.

In the 70s, a popular gift for Hawaiian kids were the Yick Lung crack seed leis.

In other East Asian countries
 

Li hung mui is also found in Korea and Japan.

Li hung mui was introduced to Japan from China through Okinawa, and was simply called Hoshiume (干し梅, dried plum). Its import, however, was stopped soon, as cyclamate was found being used. As the dried plum using candyleaf was developed in 1981 by such confectionaries as Uema Confectionary in Okinawa, it has become popular among the Japanese. It is now found in the local supermarkets in Japan.

See also
Umeboshi
Kiamoy
Saladitos
 List of dried foods

References 

Chinese fruit
Dried fruit
Hawaiian cuisine
Plum dishes
Chinese cuisine
Japanese cuisine
Korean cuisine
French Polynesian cuisine
Samoan cuisine
Polynesian Chinese cuisine